The 2021 Lucas Oil 200 Driven by General Tire was an ARCA Menards Series race held on February 13, 2021. Contested over 82 laps due to an overtime finish, on the  asphalt superspeedway, it was the first race of the 2021 ARCA Menards Series season.

Entry list

Practice 

Qualifying 

Qualifying results

Race

Race results 
Laps: 82

References 

2021 ARCA Menards Series
NASCAR races at Daytona International Speedway
Lucas Oil 200
Lucas Oil 200